Conocybe velutipes is a species of mushroom in the Bolbitiaceae family. It contains the psychedelic alkaloids psilocybin and psilocin.

References

Bolbitiaceae
Psychoactive fungi
Psychedelic tryptamine carriers